Kemira Oyj is a global chemicals company serving customers in water intensive industries. Kemira has two main segments, Pulp & Paper and Industry & Water. Kemira is headquartered in Helsinki, Finland.

In 2019, Kemira had annual revenue of around EUR 2.7 billion and over 5,000 employees. Kemira shares are listed on the Nasdaq Helsinki Ltd.

History

1920–1999

Founded in Finland in 1920 as the state-owned “Sulfuric Acid and Superphosphate Plants Corporation”, the company focused on the industrial, mining and fertilizer sectors.

In 1933 it became a joint-stock company. The company expanded strongly into various fields of chemistry through acquisitions and mergers. In 1961 the name was changed to Rikkihappo Oy. Kemira's fertilizer business began to internationalize in the late 1960s with fertilizer exports. Typpi Oy, which had been engaged in the nitrogen industry in Oulu since 1952, was merged into the company in 1971, in connection with which the company's name was changed to Kemira Oy.

In 1972, Kemira bought the paint manufacturer Tikkurila.

While Yrjö Pessi acted as a CEO from 1975 to 1990 the company started to go international. For example, the global fertilizer business began in the 1980s when Kemira acquired fertilizer plants in the United Kingdom, the Netherlands, Belgium, France and Denmark. Exports increased and sales offices were also established abroad.

During CEO Heimo Karinen (1991–1999), Kemira decided to focus on pulp and paper chemicals, industrial chemicals, paints and specialty fertilizers (Kemira Agro). [19] The Kemira Group's business structure was restructured and the business units were incorporated. Kemira Oyj was listed on the Helsinki stock exchange in November 1994.

In 1994 the company was listed on the Helsinki Stock Exchange.

2000–2009

During Tauno Pihlava's term as CEO (2000–2004), Kemira largely divested its titanium oxide business and instead acquired the water and paper chemistry business. Kemira's owners became active in 2002, when they set the goal of making Kemira the world's leading company in selected industries.

During Lasse Kurkilahti's term as President and CEO (2004–2007), Kemira made more than 30 acquisitions and sold non-core components, such as properties where the head office or Oulu Research Center operated. Kemira acquired, among other things, the paper and pulp chemistry business.  For example, in 2004 the fertilizer production Kemira Agro Oy was spun off into its own company, Kemira GrowHow. The Siilinjärvi mica factory was sold to Sweden. In 2017 Norwegian Yara bought GrowHow (now Yara Finland). The fine chemicals were incorporated into KemFine Oy, which was sold to the private equity firm 3i in 2004.

In 2005, Kemira's net sales were approximately EUR 2 billion. The company acquired Finnish Chemicals 'mills in the spring and Lanxess' paper chemicals mills in Germany in December, making Kemira the world's largest producer of paper chemicals. Kemira was also the market leader in pulp chemicals.

In August 2007, the Finnish state sold 32.1% of Kemira's shares to domestic investors for EUR 655.6 million, reducing its holding from 48.6% to 16.5%. Oras Invest bought 17.1% and pension insurance companies 14.97% of Kemira's shares.

In 2008 Kemira decided to concentrate on water chemistry, and the following year, 75 percent of the company's revenue came from water chemicals, water treatment and other water technologies.

Harri Kerminen's (2008–2012) President and CEO term was largely spent on the integration of acquisitions made by Kurkilahti and the reorganization of the organization. In September 2008, Kemira and Rockwood formed a joint venture that merged both Kemira's and Rockwood's titanium dioxide business and Rockwood's functional additives business.

2010–

Tikkurila, which manufactures paints and industrial coatings, was spun off from Kemira in March 2010, when it distributed the majority of Tikkurila's shares as a dividend to its own shareholders. Kemira had 14% of Tikkurila's share capital, which it sold in 2011. In April the Kokkola sulfuric acid plant was sold to Boliden, but Kemira continued its warehousing and loading operations.

Wolfgang Büchele, who served as President and CEO from 2012 to 2014, focused Kemira's efforts on water-intensive industries. During his time, some twenty mills were also closed, including the Vaasa paper chemicals mill, which closed at the end of 2013. In the summer of 2013 Kemira acquired the Italian chemical company 3F Chimica. The transaction included production facilities in Italy and one production facility in the United States. 3F Chimica's products included dry polyacrylamide and emulsion polyacrylamide, as well as related process chemicals. In December 2013, Kemira announced that it would sell its entire formic acid business to Taminco in the United States. The deal included about 160 employees and a formic acid plant in Oulu, as well as feed preservation products and airport runway de-icers.

In February 2014, Rockwood acquired Kemira's shareholding (39%) in the titanium dioxide joint venture Sachtleben GmbH. Rockwood's pigment business and at the same time the Pori titanium dioxide plant were acquired in the same year by the US Huntsman Corporation. In July of the same year, Kemira announced the acquisition of AkzoNobel's paper chemicals business, whose products were used, for example, to coat and strengthen paper and packaging board.

Kemira sold parts of its ChemSolutions segment, which provided chemicals like formic acid to the food, feed, pharmaceutical and chemical industries to Taminco.

In March 2016, Kemira announced the construction of a new sodium chlorate production line and cell hall at its Joutseno plant. The value of the investment was around EUR 50-60 million.

In 2017 Kemira merged its three segments Pulp & Paper, Municipal & Industrial and Oil & Mining into two segments Pulp & Paper and Industry & Water.

Organization

Kemira's headquartered is in Salmisaari, Helsinki and it has research centers in Espoo, Shanghai and Atlanta.

Since 2017 Kemira have had two main segments, Pulp & Paper and Industry & Water

Management
Kemira's President and CEO is Jari Rosendal (since May 2014).

Members of the Board of Directors as of May 5, 2020 were Chair Jari Paasikivi (Chairman), Kerttu Tuomas (Vice Chairman), and Wolfgang Büchele, Shirley Cunningham, Werner Fuhrmann, Kaisa Hietala and Timo Lappalainen.

Owners
Kemira’s main shareholder is Oras Invest Oy and its owners, members of the Paasikivi family. Its former main owner, the State of Finland, sold the largest part of its holding to Finnish investors in August 2007. In June 2020 the biggest owners were 
Oras Invest Oy (20.1%), Solidium Oy (10.2%) and Varma Mutual Pension Insurance Company (3.4%).

Markets

Kemira is one of the largest companies in the water chemistry industry. In 2010, its competitors were Nalco, Ashland and GE Water in the United States and competitors in China, usually manufacturing the same chemical. In 2019, its largest competitors were Ecolab, Nouryon, SNF, Solenis and Solvay. Kemira has a wide range of water chemicals and it is involved in the production of drinking water, the purification and reuse of industrial process water. Its customers operate in water-intensive industries like the pulp and paper industry, municipal and industrial water treatment, and the oil and gas industry.

Acknowledgments
In 2015, Kemira was selected for the Nordic Investor Index, which assesses the risks and opportunities related to climate change. The Carbon Disclosure Leadership Index was maintained by the Carbon Disclosure Project, or CDP, of 882 investors, which helps investors assess the risks and opportunities of companies related to climate change. Kemira received 99 points out of 100 in the evaluation. 
In 2015, EcoVadis, which measures corporate responsibility in global supply chains, estimated that Kemira was among the suppliers it evaluates at the gold level, in the best five percent, both among all evaluators and in the chemical sector. Kemira has kept its gold level also in 2016 – 2019.
In 2017, the Swedish analysis and consulting company Regi chose Kemira as the best company in Finland in the large company category. Reg's investor relations study evaluates corporate financial communications using 24 criteria.

References 

Manufacturing companies based in Helsinki
Companies listed on Nasdaq Helsinki
Chemical companies of Finland
Chemical companies established in 1920
Articles containing video clips
1920 establishments in Finland